Avatu Opeloge (born ~2005) is a Samoan Weightlifter who has represented Samoa at the Pacific Mini Games. She is the daughter of Olympic- and Commonwealth Games-medalist Ele Opeloge.

At the 2022 Pacific Mini Games in Saipan, Northern Mariana Islands she won three bronze medals in the 76 kg category.

References

Living people
Samoan female weightlifters
21st-century Samoan people
Year of birth missing (living people)